Aggression is a 2008 video game. Developed by Russian company Lesta Studio, the game was originally to be published by  Buka Entertainment, however the rights were later acquired by Playlogic Entertainment who ultimately published the title.

Development 
As part of the promotional campaign, " Buka " and Russian chain stores " Eldorado " and " IT " announced a competition called "Iron Aggression."

A fansite - authorised and in association with the developers - entitled Blitzfront was released.

By January 2007 it was to be released in the second quarter of that year. This was later postponed to 2008.

Plot and gameplay 
The game is a real-time strategy with tactical elements. The game allows players to lead campaigns from the 1900s to the 1950s.

Critical reception 
GameSpot noted the game's similarity to the Total War franchise. Games Radar praised its ambitiousness. Meristation said the game lacked the detail of the Command & Conquer series. GameZone felt the interface was "clean" and easily navigable. Game Watcher wrote that the best say to speak about the game is in describing what is lacks, as opposed to what it has. Stop praised the simple controls. Jeuxvideo felt a good concept was not followed through with a good game.

References

External links 

 Interview with Internet Wars
 OGL Preview
 Gaming Excellence preview
 Boomtown preview
 Boomtown interview
 Main page

2008 video games
Real-time strategy video games
Video games developed in Russia
Windows games
Windows-only games
World War I video games
World War II video games
Buka Entertainment games
Playlogic Entertainment games
Lesta Studio games